Actinopyga is a genus of sea cucumbers found in coastal waters in tropical and temperate regions.

Species

There are 18 recognized species:

References

Holothuriidae
Holothuroidea genera
Taxa named by Heinrich Georg Bronn